Víla Amálka (Amalka the Fairy) is a Czechoslovak animated television series created in 1975. It was, and still regularly is, aired as part of Večerníček, a long-running evening programme aimed at children. The artwork was created by Václav Čtvrtek. The show itself was drawn and directed by Václav Bedřich, with narration by Jiří Hrzán. A total of 13 episodes of about 8 minutes each were produced.

In 2013, Amalka the Fairy started gaining popularity in Japan, with the episodes having been dubbed into Japanese. A toy range featuring characters from the show has also been released.

References 

1975 Czechoslovak television series debuts
1975 Czechoslovak television series endings
Czechoslovak animated television series
Czech animated television series
1970s Czechoslovak  television series
1970s animated television series
Fictional fairies and sprites